Astape is a genus of praying mantis in the family Haaniidae, containing the single species Astape denticollis.

References

 
Thespidae
Mantodea genera
Monotypic insect genera